Staryye Balgazi (İśke Balğajı) is a rural locality (a village) in Kozhay-Semyonovsky Selsoviet, Miyakinsky District, Bashkortostan, Russia. The population was 71 as of 2010. There is 1 street.

Geography 
Staryye Balgazi is located 17 km north of Kirgiz-Miyaki (the district's administrative centre) by road. Kozhay-Semyonovka and Miyakitamak are the nearest rural localities.

References 

Rural localities in Miyakinsky District